The 1927 Auckland Rugby League season was its 18th. Newton defeated Ponsonby by 6 points to 3 in the championship final to win the Monteith Shield after both teams finished the season tied with identical 8 win, 1 draw, 3 loss records. This was the second time Newton had won the championship in 18 efforts, with the first being in 1912 and was to be their last after they merged decades later with City Rovers and the combined team ceased in the early 2000s. Richmond won the Roope Rooster knockout trophy for the second consecutive season. Newton Rangers defeated Richmond to win the Stormont Shield.

Ellerslie won the Norton Cup by winning the second division competition, known as the B Grade at this time. They were undefeated and also won the Stallard Cup which was the B Grade knockout trophy. Interestingly the league played a 'promotion-relegation' match, with Ellerslie by virtue of winning the Norton Cup for winning the B Grade playing off with Grafton, who had finished last in the A Grade. Ellerslie won 11–3 over Grafton thus winning the right to compete in the A grade competition in the 1928 season. Despite this there was still considerable discussion at the annual general meeting the following year as to whether or not Ellerslie be admitted to the A Grade. It was eventually decided that they would be, with Grafton dropping to the B Grade.

Other trophies awarded (at the 1928 annual general meeting of the Auckland Rugby League) were the Davis Points Shield to Richmond, the Thistle Cup to Newton, and a special cup for the best forward to W.Clark from Newton.

Auckland rugby league news

Transfers 
A McIntyre who had been playing in Sydney joined the Newton club.

Annual meetings of Auckland Rugby League 
The annual report for the 1927 season stated that the total revenue for Auckland Rugby League was £5,597, with £4,216 taken at the gates. At the annual meeting of the Junior Management Committee of the Auckland Rugby League on 23 March it was stated in their report that junior players exceeded 1,500. It was also reported that the Remuera League Club was being revived. They had fielded two junior teams in 1914, and appeared to have the numbers to enter two junior teams in the 1927 season. On 10 August the Auckland Rugby League Chairman, Mr. W.J. Hammill tendered his resignation for business reasons. He had occupied the position for five years. He was congratulated on his contribution to the game and made a life member of the League. Mr. George Rhodes was elected as the new chairman of the Management Committee.

Representative season 
Auckland began the season with a match against the returning members of the New Zealand team that had toured England from August 1926 to January 1927. There was some controversy in that Joe Menzies had played for the 'New Zealand team' despite being from the South Auckland (Waikato) province and the New Zealand Rugby League questioned the Auckland Rugby League on the selection. One possible reason for his selection may have been the fact that Arthur Singe had been banned for life after going on strike during the tour along with 6 other players. This meant that there was one less Auckland forward to pick for the match. Auckland won the game 24–21. They went on a southern tour later in the season and played matches against Canterbury, West Coast, Otago, and Wellington. After their return to Auckland they played against Buller and South Auckland. The Buller side was coached by Bill Davidson who had spent many years playing for City Rovers, Auckland, and played for New Zealand from 1919 to 1921. He had later moved to the Canterbury region where he was involved in sporting administration. He later returned to Auckland and coached Ponsonby in the 1938 season. Auckland lost the Northern Union Challenge Cup to South Auckland in their final game of the season.

Monteith Shield (first grade championship)

Monteith Shield standings
{|
|-
|

Monteith Shield results 
After two completed rounds Newton and Ponsonby were both tied on 19 competition points. This necessitated a final between the two sides and this was won by Newton 6–3.

Round 1
Jim O'Brien and J Stormont (ex-Marist players) had both retired from the game and were spectators at the match between Marist and Grafton. However, after watching they decided to come out of retirement and resume playing for their old team. Meanwhile Craddock Dufty returned to play for Newton after 5 years with Grafton Athletic. Les Bull refereed his 50th match involving senior rugby league teams in Auckland and was the third man to do this after Archie Ferguson (1912-22) and Billy Murray (1913-25).

Round 2
Prior to round 2 Wigan made an offer to Lou Brown  of the City side, while Ben Davidson had reportedly received one from Hull. Future New Zealand coach Bill Telford debuted for Richmond and scored a try in their 15-15 draw with City. In the same match brothers Ken and Ray Hyland clashed heads diving to save a try with the result that Ken had to leave the field and Ray had to bandage his bleeding head to continue.

Round 3
 Jim O'Brien and Stewart were both sent off for fighting near the Richmond try line in the Marist v Richmond match. Grafton only had 12 players make the trip to Devonport Domain where they were thrashed by Devonport 47–3. Nelson Bass tore his knee cartilage in the match between City and Ponsonby and was forced into early retirement. Arthur Rae made his first grade refereeing debut in the match between Devonport and Grafton on the Devonport Domain.

Round 4

Round 5
The Devonport v Richmond match was played on the Friday as part of the King's Birthday celebrations. It was notable for the fact that 4 players were ordered off. Neville St George who had had words with the referee was sent from the field, two minutes later Stewart from Richmond joined him and Stan Prentice (Richmond), and Jim O'Brien (Devonport) soon followed. Leslie Knott scored two tries for Marist. At the end of the season he became the Auckland singles tennis champion and New Zealand doubles champion before moving to Australia to advance his career.

Round 6
City were without the services of Lou Brown, Maurice Wetherill, G Brown, Nelson Bass and Alf Townsend and were soundly beaten by Marist. Frank Delgrosso of Ponsonby was ordered off in their match with Devonport.

Round 7
City had lost the services of Lou Brown and Ben Davidson who had both been signed by Wigan during the week. They would depart for England later in the month. In their match with Devonport two players for Newton left the field injured during the second half leaving them with 11 players.

Round 8
City were further weakened after Alf Townsend was transferred to Dunedin permanently for work during the week. In the Marist match with Grafton, N King broke a bone in his hand and had to leave the field.

Round 9
City sought to strengthen their side due to the large number of players who had departed. They signed Godkin, a Bay of Plenty rugby player, Pascoe a Manukau rugby player, and E Spencer a league representative from the Waimairi club in Canterbury. H Mason also joined the City side from Huntly (Len Mason's brother). Devonport captain Jim O'Brien was ordered off in their loss to Marist. At the conclusion of the match the referee (H. Taylor) was escorted from the field by two police officers as several spectators crowded and heckled him. Opponents Jack Kirwan and his namesake Jim O'Brien (Marist) had tried to plead his case to the referee to allow him to stay on the field and the Devonport later wrote a letter to the Marist club thanking them. Taylor had replaced W. Ripley as referee after Ripley fell ill before the match. The match between Newton and Ponsonby at the Auckland Domain was postponed due to the ground being unfit for play. He was suspended for their following match. The following weekend saw all games suspended and the postponed match played at Carlaw Park. Ironically rain fell throughout the match and the field "was badly churned up as the game progressed".

Round 10
Richmond lost captain Jim Parkes who was moving back to Christchurch to join the Hornby club. The match between Devonport and Grafton was postponed due to the unfit nature of the field at the Auckland Domain. It was played on the following weekend at Devonport with other fixtures from that round not played due to the Auckland Rugby League making Carlaw Park available for the soccer match between New Zealand and Canada. Ponsonby fielded 3 brothers, future New Zealand international Tim Peckham, and his older brother Joseph, and younger brother Kenneth.

Round 11

Round 12

Round 13
 Bert Avery was carried off the field with concussion in the Newton match against Grafton. He had been attempting to tackle M Herewini who tried to hurdle him and made contact with Avery's head. Avery was taken to Auckland Hospital where he eventually recovered. His brother Henry who was also a league played died later in the week after a bout of pneumonia and Bert Avery decided to retire after many years playing for and captaining Grafton and New Zealand.

Round 14

Final

Roope Rooster knockout competition

Round 1
Craddock Dufty and captain W Clarke were both out injured from the Newton side for their match with Marist. Hamilton went off injured for City meaning they had to finish the match with Richmond with 12 players. The scores were tied at the end of the match 17–17 so 5 minutes extra time was played with Telford scoring and Carroll converting to win the game for Richmond. This was the first time extra time had been used to decide a game in an Auckland Rugby League senior competition. Usually matches were replayed the following week.

Semi finals
The Auckland representative team had left for their southern tour and so all teams were fielding greatly weakened sides. Holmes, a rugby representative three-quarter signed for Devonport just before their game with Ponsonby.

Final
A. Finlayson switched codes to join Richmond signing one minute before kick off so as to keep the switch secret. The following week he applied for reinstatement into rugby union. Richmond won the Roope Rooster for the second consecutive year. It was a case of déjà vu with another 1 pt victory over Devonport who they had beaten the year before.

Stormont Memorial Shield 
Newton won the match by 25 points to 14, but the match was noteworthy due to the large number of injuries suffered. G. Norman the Newton captain was concussed and had his jaw broken, Dick Stack fractured his leg, W. Rhodes broke his collar-bone, and Wally Somers sprained his ankle. The first three players were all taken to Auckland Hospital, while Somers was taken home. Stacks leg injury was so bad in fact that his leg had to be amputated and he spent many months in hospital. There were several matches in the following season used to raise funds for him and his family.

A Grade/B Grade promotion-relegation match 
At the conclusion of the A and B division competitions the last placed Grafton Athletic from the A Division played against the winners of the B Division Ellerslie for the right to compete in the A Division in 1928. Ellerslie won the match by 11 points to 3 thus earning themselves a place in A Division and forcing Grafton Athletic to play in the lower grade. This was the first time in Auckland Rugby League competition that such a match had been played.

Top try scorers and point scorers
Top try and point scorers for A Division, Roope Rooster and Stormont Shield competitions.

B Division (Norton Cup) standings and results 
A large number of games did not have the scores reported in either The New Zealand Herald or the Auckland Star. As a result, the fixtures list is incomplete as is the final standings. Results are missing as follows, Kingsland x 2, Parnell x 1, Mangere x 4, Point Chevalier x 1, and Otahuhu x 1). In addition there were two cancelled matches. The round 4 match between Mangere and Kingsland did not have the result reported though it was said several weeks later that Kingsland was undefeated so they must have won the match. The Ellerslie match with Mangere on July 9 is missing the score so Ellerslie and Mangere teams for and against is incomplete.

B Division standings

B Division (Norton Cup) fixtures 
The Round 8 match between Mangere and Northcote was not played due to the condition of the ground at Mangere. However after an inquiry it was stated that the Mangere team was willing to play and the referee said the match could go ahead. The Northcote team thought the match shouldn't be played and did not take the field. They also complained that they had to get changed underneath a gorse bush while a local official said there was a dressing room at Northcote's disposal. The league awarded the match to Mangere. The Round 15 match between Otahuhu and Northcote at the Auckland Domain was not played due to the condition of the field.

Stallard Cup knockout competition

Other club matches and lower grades

Lower grade competitions

Second grade (Wright Cup)
Devonport won the competition with a season record of played 14, won 13, lost 1, points for 252 and against 62. Devonport also won knock out competition (Foster Shield) when they beat Remuera 15 to 7 on October 8 at Carlaw Park. City withdrew after 3 rounds, Grafton Athletic (Maritime) withdrew after 4 rounds, and Marist withdrew after round 15 near the end of the season. Newton entered a side in the knockout competition but were knocked out by Devonport immediately 32 points to 0. Ponsonby lost their semi final to Devonport, while Mangere were the other losing semi finalists, going down to Remuera 12 to 5.
{|
|-
|

Third grade open (Walker Shield)
New Lynn won the competition by one point after a 3-3 draw with Grafton Athletic on July 30. The majority of match results were not reported so the standings are significantly incomplete. Grafton Athletic (Maritime) won the knockout competition when they defeated Devonport 12-3 on September 24. Grafton had beaten Glen Eden 3-2 in one semi final while Devonport beat Ponsonby 6-3 in the other semi final. Northcote withdrew from the championship after 7 rounds.
{|
|-
|

Third grade intermediate
There were several results not reported and the winner of the championship was never reported in any of the Auckland newspapers however it is almost certain that one of the two Richmond teams won the competition as they won the overwhelming majority of their matches. Interestingly the following season at the Auckland Rugby League annual meeting when trophies were presented to winning teams in all grades there was none presented in this grade, possibly because it was an intermediate grade and only in its second year of competition. Richmond had won it in 1926 and won it again in 1928. The Richmond A team won the knockout competition when they defeated City in the final on October 8 by 20 points to 0. City had beaten Parnell 20-2 in one semi-final, while Richmond A won their semi-final 5-0 against Newton. Devonport withdrew from the championship after 16 rounds near the end of the season.
{|
|-
|

Fourth grade (Hospital Cup)
Richmond won the championship. Devonport won the knockout competitions when they beat Richmond 12-5 in the final on October 15. Richmond beat Remuera 19-0 in one semi final while Devonport beat Grafton Athletic (Maritime) in the other by 24 points to 2.
{|
|-
|

Fifth grade (Endean Shield)
Akarana won the championship. Not all of the results were reported so the standings are incomplete. They also won the knockout competition when they beat City in the final on October 15 by 7 points to 3. Newton withdrew from the competition after 4 rounds.
{|
|-
|

Sixth grade A
Akarana won the championship after beating Grafton Athletic (Maritime) 11 to 5 in the final on August 27. Devonport United won the Hammill Cup for winning the knockout competition when they beat Grafton Athletic in the final on October 22.
{|
|-
|

Sixth grade B (Myers Cup)
Richmond win the championship after beating Marist 6-0 on September 3. Marist won the knockout competition when they defeated Akarana 5-0 on October 8. Marist beat Richmond 7-6 in the semi final.
{|
|-
|

Schoolboys competition
Otahuhu was a combination of students from several schools in the area and as such did not represent Otahuhu Primary School. The other schools were from the individual schools. Newton Central Primary School entered a team in some matches late in the season and Newmarket Primary school entered a second side around the same time.
{|
|-
|

Exhibition matches

Huntly v Newton

Devonport v Ponsonby
The final match of the season was one played by Devonport against Ponsonby for charity. The money raised was given to the Mayor's unemployment fund.

Other matches

Representative season 
The Auckland teams for the season were to be selected by Ernie Asher, E.V. Fox, and A Blakey. The Auckland representative team won 6 of its 7 matches. They began the year with a victory over the Auckland representatives of the New Zealand team which had toured the England and recently returned home. They went on a 4 match tour during the year which saw victories over Canterbury, West Coast, Otago, and Wellington. They then played home matches against Buller and South Auckland. They beat Buller easily but then lost the Northern Union Challenge Cup after a loss to South Auckland.

Representative fixtures 
The first representative fixture of the season was played on 30 April between Auckland and the Auckland members of the 1926 New Zealand touring team of England.

Auckland v New Zealand (Auckland members)

Southern Tour
In September Auckland toured the south, playing 4 matches. The 18 man touring side was Charles Gregory, Craddock Dufty, M Little, George Wade, Claude List, Joe Wilson jun., Maurice Wetherill, Stan Prentice, Stan Webb, A McIntyre, Wally Somers, Jim O'Brien (Devonport), Lou Hutt, Alan Clarke, Trevor Hall, Horace Dixon, A Payne, and F Bass. Several players originally named were unable to make the trip including Hec Brisbane, Riley, Usher, Frank Delgrosso, and J Beattie.

Auckland v Canterbury (Northern Union C.C.)

West Coast/Buller v Auckland (Northern Union C.C.)

Otago v Auckland (Northern Union C.C.)

Wellington v Auckland

Interisland fixture

North Island v South Island

Auckland v Buller
The Buller side was coached by former City Rovers, Auckland, and New Zealand player, Bill Davidson.

Auckland v South Auckland (Northern Union C.C.)

Auckland representative matches played and scorers

References

External links 
 Auckland Rugby League Official Site

    
    
    
    

Auckland Rugby League seasons
Auckland Rugby League